The following lists events that happened during 2001 in Cape Verde.

Incumbents
President:
António Mascarenhas Monteiro
Pedro Pires
Prime Minister:
Gualberto do Rosário
José Maria Neves

Events
Jean Piaget University of Cape Verde established in Praia
January 14: Cape Verdean parliamentary election took place
February 1: José Maria Neves becomes Prime Minister of Cape Verde
February 11-26: Cape Verdean presidential election took place
March 22: Pedro Pires becomes President of Cape Verde

Arts and entertainment
Vasco Martins' fourth symphony titled Buda Dharma (Budda Dharma) was completed
June 5: Cesária Évora's album São Vicente di Longe' released

Sports
Onze Unidos won the Cape Verdean Football Championship

Deaths
Orlando Pantera (b. 1967)

References

 
Years of the 21st century in Cape Verde
2000s in Cape Verde
Cape Verde
Cape Verde